Acacia deanei (Deane's wattle, green wattle; syn. Acacia paucijuga Wakef. [= Acacia deanei subsp. paucijuga], Racosperma deanei (R.T.Baker) Pedley) is a tree native to Australia, which is useful for controlling soil erosion. There are two subspecies: Acacia deanei subsp. deanei and Acacia deanei subsp. paucijuga.

Description
It has angled to terete ridged branchlets with tiny yellow to whitish hairs. The seed pods that form after flowering are flat and straight to curved and constricted between seeds.

Taxonomy
The species was first formally described in 1932 in the Journal and Proceedings of the Royal Society of New South Wales. It was reclassified as Racosperma deanei in 1986 by Leslie Pedley then transferred back to genus Acacia in 2001. The only other synonym is Acacia decurrens var. deanei.

The specific epithet honours Henry Deane, who was a railway engineer and amateur botanist, who collected the type specimen. 
A. deanei is similar in appearance and often mistaken for Acacia mearnsii and Acacia parramattensis.

There are two subspecies:
 Acacia deanei (R.T.Baker) M.B.Welch, Coombs & McGlynn subsp. deanei known as Deane's wattle
 Acacia deanei subsp. paucijuga (F.Muell. ex N.A.Wakef.) Tindale.

Distribution
The plant is endemic to eastern Australia through Queensland, New South Wales and Victoria. It is found in a variety of habitat often as a part of sclerophyll forest communities growing in a range of different soil types. It is common through inland parts of southern Queensland, and central arts of both New south Wales and Victoria.

See also
 List of Acacia species

References

External links
FAO: Acacia deanei

deanei
Trees of Australia
Fabales of Australia
Flora of Victoria (Australia)
Plants described in 1932